Shawn Rowe (born 7 December 1992) in Kingston, Jamaica in a place called Red hills road. shawn Rowe is a Jamaican athlete who competes predominantly in the 400 metres hurdles.

Career
Rowe attended Saint Augustine's University in North Carolina where he was a four-time NCAA Division II national champion and six-time first-team All-American, as well as earning a criminal justice degree.

After finishing second in the Jamaican Olympic trials in June 2021, Rowe was selected in the Jamaican team for the delayed 2020 Summer Games in Tokyo. He ran a 49.18 seasons best to reach the semi finals. He is also an author of a book called Hurdling my barriers. He was also a fourth-place finisher and CAC and NACAC championships in 2018.

References

1992 births
Living people
Jamaican male hurdlers
St. Augustine's Falcons men's track and field athletes
Athletes (track and field) at the 2020 Summer Olympics
Olympic athletes of Jamaica
20th-century Jamaican people
21st-century Jamaican people